Maroc 7 is a 1967 British thriller film directed by Gerry O'Hara and starring Gene Barry, Elsa Martinelli, Leslie Phillips and Denholm Elliott. The screenplay concerns an international jewel thief who hatches a plan to go to Morocco and steal a valuable artifact.

The theme song was an instrumental by the Shadows: "Maroc 7" rose to No. 24 on the UK Singles Chart in April 1967.

Production
The film was the fifth in a series of movies jointly financed by Rank and the National Film Finance Corporation (NFFC).

The sets were designed by the art directors Seamus Flannery and Terry Pritchard. It was shot at Pinewood Studios and on location in Morocco. Filming began 6 July 1966. The production went over budget.

Plot
Louise Henderson is the editor of a respected fashion magazine, but she has a hidden career as mastermind of a ring of thieves. With their professional operation as a front, Louise uses one of her models, Claudia, and a photographer, Raymond Lowe, to steal precious artifacts and jewels.

Law enforcement agencies have their suspicions about her, so undercover man Simon Grant is assigned the case. He pretends to be a safecracker to infiltrate Louise's gang, traveling to Morocco, where she intends to switch an imitation Arabian medallion for a priceless real one.

Grant is given cooperation in Morocco by a chief of police, Barrada, and a woman named Michelle Craig who is the chief's top aide. Things go wrong when Grant needs to kill Lowe, who has followed him on his way to find the map to the location of the medallion.

The theft goes on as planned, at least until Claudia dies while trying to take the medallion from Grant. To the surprise of cops and robbers alike, the precious medallion is stolen by the one person none of them suspected, Michelle, who escapes.

Cast
 Gene Barry as Simon Grant
 Elsa Martinelli as Claudia
 Leslie Phillips as Raymond Lowe
 Cyd Charisse as Louise Henderson
 Denholm Elliott as Inspector Barrada
 Alexandra Stewart as Michelle Craig
 Angela Douglas as Freddie
 Eric Barker as Professor Bannen
 Tracy Reed as Vivienne
 Maggie London as Suzie
 Ann Norman as Alexa
 Penny Riley as Penny
 Lionel Blair as Hotel receptionist
 Ricardo Montez as Pablo

Novelization
Concurrent with the release of the film, UK publisher Pan Books released a novelization of the screenplay by the ubiquitous and prolific British tie-in author John Burke writing as "Martin Sands."

References

Notes

1967 films
British thriller films
1960s thriller films
Films directed by Gerry O'Hara
Films shot in Morocco
1960s English-language films
1960s British films